Sidi Ghanem is a town and rural commune in Chichaoua Province of the Marrakech-Tensift-Al Haouz region of Morocco. At the time of the 2004 census, the commune had a total population of 8,667 people living in 1,720 households. Sidi Ghamen is widely known as an artistic and creative hub within the Marrakech region.

References

Populated places in Chichaoua Province
Rural communes of Marrakesh-Safi